The Oak Grove School is a historic Rosenwald School building in rural Hale County, Alabama, United States.  It was built to the designs of Samuel Smith in 1925 to serve the local African American community. The money to build the school was provided by the Julius Rosenwald Fund.  The school was listed on the National Register of Historic Places on March 3, 1998, as a part of The Rosenwald School Building Fund and Associated Buildings Multiple Property Submission.

See also
Historical Marker Database

References

National Register of Historic Places in Hale County, Alabama
School buildings on the National Register of Historic Places in Alabama
School buildings completed in 1925
Defunct schools in Alabama
Rosenwald schools in Alabama
Historically segregated African-American schools in Alabama
1925 establishments in Alabama